Antony Mark Hamilton-Bram (born 29 March 1966) is an English football manager who is the head coach of Hong Kong Premier League club HKFC.

Career
Hamilton-Bram played for Club Albion in the Yau Yee Football League between 2006 and 2017.

Career statistics

Notes

References

1966 births
Living people
English footballers
English football managers
English expatriate football managers
English expatriate footballers
English expatriate sportspeople in Hong Kong
Expatriate footballers in Hong Kong
Expatriate football managers in Hong Kong
Association footballers not categorized by position